Hot Sam Pretzels was an American restaurant chain selling soft pretzels.

Julius Young opened the first outlet at Livonia Mall in a Detroit suburb in Michigan.

In 1971, the owners sold the company to General Host, who then owned the Detroit-based retailer Frank's Nursery & Crafts.  General Host sold it again in 1986.

Mrs. Fields acquired the chain in 1995. Mrs. Field's purchased Pretzel Time in 1996 and merged the two chains under the "Pretzel Time" brand. The last 10 locations were converted in 2005.

In popular culture 

Hot Sam was recreated in 2018 for an appearance in the mall food court of the Netflix series Stranger Things, which is set in the mid-1980s. The faux mall facades were constructed at Gwinnett Place Mall near Atlanta, Georgia, where the series is filmed.

References 

Pretzels
Restaurants in Michigan
Defunct companies based in Michigan
Defunct fast-food chains in the United States
American companies established in 1967
Restaurants established in 1967
1967 establishments in Michigan
2005 disestablishments in Michigan
Restaurants disestablished in 2005
1971 mergers and acquisitions
1995 mergers and acquisitions
Defunct restaurant chains in the United States